Love Machine is the third full-length album by Canadian  band, Brighton Rock. The album was released in 1991. It is the final studio album to feature vocalist Gerry McGhee before his death on August 25, 2020.

History
Before the album was recorded, the band's keyboardist, Johnny Rogers, departed the band.  Brighton Rock wanted a harder sound, with lead vocalist Gerry McGhee stating, "We didn't really feel that keyboards were part of us anymore.  There's really no place for them in our musical direction now."  Rogers was replaced for touring purposes by a second guitar player, Greg Bioleau, who previously played with McGhee in his first band, The Rockers.

The album failed to chart, but the single "Hollywood Shuffle" charted at #6 on the Cancon: To Watch chart. In 1992 the album was nominated for a Juno Award for Hard Rock Album of the Year.  Cocaine was recorded live in the studio with one take.

Track listing
"Bulletproof"
"Hollywood Shuffle"
"Love Machine"
"Still the One"
"Mr. Mistreater"
"Nightstalker"
"Love in a Bottle"
"Nothin' to Lose"
"Heart of Steel"
"Cocaine"
"Magic is Back"

Unreleased tracks
"Gang Bang"
 According to vocalist Gerry McGhee, the track "Gang Bang" was dropped by Warner Canada for lyrical content, even though the same label released "Get The Fuck Out" by Skid Row at the same time.

Personnel
Brighton Rock
Gerry McGhee – vocals
Greg Fraser – guitars
Steve Skreebs – bass guitar
Mark Cavarzan – drums

Production
Toby Wright – producer and engineering

Charts

Singles

References

1991 albums
Albums produced by Toby Wright
Brighton Rock (band) albums